The Provisional Capital Memorial Hall is a museum in Busan, South Korea. The building was used by the President of South Korea, Syngman Rhee when Busan was the provisional capital of South Korea during the Korean War.

The hall was initially used as the Gyeongnam provincial governor's official residence since its completion on August 10, 1926. For 3 years, Busan was the Korean provisional capital during the time of the Korean War. During this period, this building was used as the president's residence.

In 1984, this building became the Provisional Capital Memorial Hall, and exhibited pictures and other artifacts from the Korean War.

This building was renovated from April 2000 to November 2001 to its current state. During the renovation, the Photographic Gallery section was added. The gallery houses a collection of photographs from the Korean War.

The Provisional Capital Memorial Hall is Designated Artifact #53 of Busan Metropolitan City.

References

Museums in Busan